5'-AMP-activated protein kinase subunit beta-1 is an enzyme that in humans is encoded by the PRKAB1 gene.

The protein encoded by this gene is a regulatory subunit of the AMP-activated protein kinase (AMPK). AMPK is a heterotrimer consisting of an alpha catalytic subunit, and non-catalytic beta and gamma subunits. AMPK is an important energy-sensing enzyme that monitors cellular energy status. In response to cellular metabolic stresses, AMPK is activated, and thus phosphorylates and inactivates acetyl-CoA carboxylase (ACC) and beta-hydroxy beta-methylglutaryl-CoA reductase (HMGCR), key enzymes involved in regulating de novo biosynthesis of fatty acid and cholesterol. This subunit may be a positive regulator of AMPK activity. The myristoylation and phosphorylation of this subunit have been shown to affect the enzyme activity and cellular localization of AMPK. This subunit may also serve as an adaptor molecule mediating the association of the AMPK complex.

Model organisms
				
Model organisms have been used in the study of PRKAB1 function. A conditional knockout mouse line, called Prkab1tm1a(KOMP)Wtsi was generated as part of the International Knockout Mouse Consortium program — a high-throughput mutagenesis project to generate and distribute animal models of disease to interested scientists.

Male and female animals underwent a standardized phenotypic screen to determine the effects of deletion. Twenty five tests were carried out on mutant mice and four significant abnormalities were observed. Homozygous mutant males displayed impaired glucose tolerance. Animals of both sex had increased circulating bilirubin levels, increased IgG3 levels, and a number of atypical haematology parameters.

Interactions
PRKAB1 has been shown to interact with PRKAG2 and PRKAG1.

The 5'-AMP-activated protein kinase beta subunit interaction domain (AMPKBI) is a conserved domain found in the beta subunit of the 5-AMP-activated protein kinase complex, and its yeast homologues Sip1 (SNF1-interacting protein 1), Sip2 (SNF1-interacting protein 2) and Gal83 (galactose metabolism 83), which are found in the SNF1 (sucrose non-fermenting) kinase complex. This region is sufficient for interaction of this subunit with the kinase complex, but is not solely responsible for the interaction, and the interaction partner is not known.

References

Further reading

External links 
 PDBe-KB provides an overview of all the structure information available in the PDB for Human 5'-AMP-activated protein kinase subunit beta-1 (PRKAB1)

Genes mutated in mice
EC 2.7.11